This is a list of the National Register of Historic Places listings in Rusk County, Texas.

This is intended to be a complete list of properties and districts listed on the National Register of Historic Places in Rusk County, Texas. There are one district, five individual properties, and one former property listed on the National Register in the county. Two individually listed properties are Recorded Texas Historic Landmarks with one additional located within the district and another on one of the individual properties.

Current listings

The publicly disclosed locations of National Register properties and districts may be seen in a mapping service provided.

|}

Former header

|}

See also

National Register of Historic Places listings in Texas
Recorded Texas Historic Landmarks in Rusk County

References

External links

Rusk County, Texas
Rusk County
Buildings and structures in Rusk County, Texas